America's Heart and Soul is a 2004 American documentary film produced by Blacklight Films and released by Walt Disney Pictures. It is a documentary and was directed by Louis Schwartzberg. The film was nominated for two MovieGuide Awards, winning one.

It was released on July 2, 2004, and grossed $314,402.

External links

2004 films
Walt Disney Pictures films
2004 documentary films
Films scored by Joel McNeely
Disney documentary films
2000s English-language films
2000s American films